Waravanagalavi is a village in Dharwad district of Karnataka, India.

Demographics
As of the 2011 Census of India there were 272 households in Waravanagalavi and a total population of 1,303 consisting of 667 males and 636 females. There were 216 children ages 0-6.

References

Villages in Dharwad district